Virgil Burnett (1928-2012) was an author, illustrator, and professor of Fine arts at the University of Waterloo whose works have been published in both North America and Europe. He was a Fulbright Scholarship recipient.

Personal History
Virgil Burnett was born in Wichita, Kansas on 11 January 1928 to Bertha and Virgil Burnett. His father was a flour and feed miller and a builder who traveled widely Burnett emigrated to Canada in 1972 to teach at the University of Waterloo.

Education
Burnett received his undergraduate degree at Columbia University in New York. While there, he studied with Edward Melcarth, a painter who specializes in social realism. He was drafted into the Korean War in 1950 and trained as a combat engineer, and later served in Europe as an illustrator for a propaganda company. After two years of military service, he attended University of California, Berkeley and took a master's degree in Art History in 1956. His research focused on the influence of Eugène Delacroix's work in the French Romantic school, and the relationships between art and text. After being awarded a Fulbright Scholarship to continue his research in 1956, Burnett interacted with other expat artists in Paris and became close friends with other notable artists such as David Hill. Burnett was exposed to applications of style and expression in book art by French master printer and publisher Maurice Darantiere. The contact that Burnett had with Darantiere inspired him to pursue a career in the book arts.

Fine arts works
The majority of Virgil Burnett's fine art works are illustrations. An important aspect of Burnett's work is the emphasis on the role of the illustrator to create new meaning within interpretations of a text.

Burnett illustrated the Folio Society boxed edition of The Rubaiyat of Omar Khayyam, published in London, 1970

Writing
 Towers at the Edge of a World in 1980.
 A Comedy of Eros (1984)
 Skiamachia (1982) 
 Farewell Tour (1986)
 A Sentimental Dialogue (1996)
 The Old Met, Les Halles and Other Losses: A Memoir of the Post-War Years (2005)
 Scarbo Edge: A Romance (2008).

Publishing
Burnett founded his own publishing house, Pasdeloup Press, in the 1960s, which published its first work in 1966, Le roi s'amuse.

References 

Academic staff of the University of Waterloo
American expatriates in Canada
American expatriate academics
Columbia University alumni
UC Berkeley College of Letters and Science alumni
American illustrators
Canadian illustrators
1928 births
2012 deaths
American expatriates in France
Writers from Wichita, Kansas
Artists from Wichita, Kansas
Fulbright alumni